Hugo Báez (born 23 June 1988, in Asunción) is a Paraguayan footballer. He currently plays for Independiente F.B.C.

Báez is a left back who also plays as a center back. His nickname is the Tank.

Career 
Báez began his career at Tacuary. He later moved to Sportivo Iteño. In the summer of 2009, Báez relocated to Bulgaria together with his compatriot Jonathan Gómez to join a trial period with CSKA Sofia. Two months later he signed a contract with The Reds from Sofia and was registered for the European tournaments. Báez made his competitive debut for CSKA in their UEFA Europa League group stage match against FC Basel on 5 November 2009.

References

External links

1988 births
Living people
Paraguayan footballers
PFC CSKA Sofia players
Club Olimpia footballers
Club Rubio Ñu footballers
Deportivo Capiatá players
Expatriate footballers in Bulgaria
Paraguayan expatriates in Bulgaria
First Professional Football League (Bulgaria) players
Association football fullbacks